The Secretary of State for Telecommunications and Digital Infrastructures (SETID) is senior minister of the Spanish Department of Economic Affairs and Digital Transformation.

The Secretary of State for Telecommunications is responsible for the promotion, regulation and knowledge of the telecommunications sector, audiovisual services and the Information Society, the dialogue with the professional, industrial and academic sectors and the coordination or cooperation between different ministries and with other public administrations regarding these matters.

The Secretariat of State, led by the SETID, is divided in two departments; one with the level of Directorate-General and other with the level of Deputy Directorate-General.

History
Since the arrival of the democracy to Spain, becoming an advanced country was one of the goals of the first democratic governments and that means to have a good network of communications.

The importance was such that in 1977, a year before the Constitution was approved, a Ministry of Transport and Communications was created. This Ministry assumed most of the competences that the current Secretariat of State for Communications has and the organs of this ministry dedicated to telecoms had most of them the level of Directorate-General.

In 1985, because of the fast growing of the communications systems and media, the department dedicated to telecoms in this Ministry was elevated to the level of General Secretariat and was divided in three departments: for mail, for telecoms and for communications infraestructure.

In 1990, the Ministry was fusionated with the Ministry of Development but maintain the communications department intact.

It wasn't until 2000 when the department was elevated to the level of Secretariat of State and the current department is officially created. At the beginning received the name of Secretariat of State for Telecommunications and for the Information Society and depended from the Ministry of Science from 2000 to 2004 and from the Ministry of Industry since 2004 to its renovation in 2016.

In 2016, a new government reestructuration created a new ministry with competences over Energy, Tourism and Communications, being called Ministry of Energy, Tourism and Digital Agenda. With this ministry, the Secretariat of State was renamed Secretariat of State for the Information Society and Digital Agenda.

Two years later, in 2018, a change in the government provoked that the competences over telecommunications were transferred to the Ministry of Economy and the Secretariat of State was renamed Secretariat of State for Digital Progress. In 2020, the position of Secretary of State for Digitization and Artificial Intelligence was created and it assumed some responsibilities. This new position also assumed the oversight for Red.es, a public company in charge of the development of programs to boost the digital economy, innovation, entrepreneurship, training for young people and professionals and support for SMEs by promoting the efficient and intensive use of Information and Communication Technologies.

Structure
Under the authority of the Secretary of State there are the following departments:

 The Directorate-General for Telecommunications and Management of Audiovisual Communication Services.
 The Deputy Directorate-General for Telecommunications Management.
 The Deputy Directorate-General for Telecommunications and Digital Infrastructure Operators.
 The Deputy Directorate-General for Planning and Management of the Radioelectric Spectrum.
 The Deputy Directorate-General for Telecommunications and Digital Infrastructure Inspection.
 The Deputy Directorate-General for Customer Service of Telecommunications and Digital Services.
The Deputy Directorate-General for Audiovisual Communication Services Management.
The Provincial Offices for Telecommunications Inspection.
 The Division for Economic Programming and Hiring.

List of Secretaries of State for Telecoms

References

Secretaries of State of Spain
Telecommunications in Spain